Jadever Scale Co., Ltd. is a Taiwanese multinational corporation, manufacturer of scales, analytical instruments and components. The company is headquartered in Taipei, with several branches in Mainland China (the most important of them located in Xiamen) and sales representative offices worldwide.

The brand has achieved several milestones in its market, like to develop the first LCD display for the indicators, to have the best energy-saver scale, and more recently, the JDI robot digital scale, one of the most advanced of its type.

"Jadever" is a portmanteau of the English words "Jade" and "Ever". However, the exact translation of the Chinese name means "permanent treasure". According to the company, the name implies the slogan "We treasure the value of scale".

History and business model
Jadever was founded in July, 1986. During its first years of existence, the company advanced in technology innovation and developing a business plan.
In 1998, the first of their products received approval from the International Organization of Legal Metrology. In 1999, Xiamen Jadever Scale Co., Ltd. is established; the main production area for the company is located here. By 2006 Jadever acquired ISO 9001:2000 certification.

Currently, the company maintains its headquarters in Taipei, plus branches in four Chinese cities (Xiamen, Shanghai, Shenzhen and Wuhan) and an international branch in Markham, Canada. Jadever expects to position itself in Latin America with their regional project for 2010, aim to distribute its brand products in Spanish, Portuguese and French languages versions.

Main Products
The company produces weighing scale, price-computing scales, counting scales, indicators, platforms, load cells and several other accessories. Lately, the company is investing in expand its catalogue and improve the internal capacity and technology of its products, having as an example the most advanced model of the company, the JDI robot scale, which is on production and sale since late 2009.

See also
 List of companies of Taiwan

References
 2009. Jadever (Xiamen) Scale Co., Ltd. Annual Report.
 Company website

External links
Official Website of Jadever

Electronics companies of Taiwan
Manufacturing companies established in 1986
Taiwanese brands
Taiwanese companies established in 1986